The Tank and Armoured Cars Group (Agrupación de carros de asalto y autos blindados in Spanish) was the first armoured formation of the Corps of Volunteer Troops (Corpo Truppe Volontarie, or CTV) involved in the Spanish Civil War.  Between 3 February and 8 February 1937, Italian armour played a successful part during the Battle of Málaga.  But, between 8 March and 23 March 1937, this group was involved in the Battle of Guadalajara which turned out to be a Republican victory.

Order of battle March 1937 
Tank and Armoured Cars Group - Major Lohengrin Giraud
 1st Tank Company - Capitán Oreste Fortuna
 2nd Tank Company - Capitán Paolo Paladini
 3rd Tank Company - Capitán Miduri
 4th Tank Company - Capitán Carcio
 1st Armoured Car Company
 1st Motorized Machinegun Company - Capitán Ricci
 47mm Antitank Gun Section  
 Chemical - Flamethrower Company

See also
 L3/35
 Cannone da 47/32 M35

Sources 
de Mesa, José Luis, El regreso de las legiones: la ayuda militar italiana a la España nacional, 1936-1939,  García Hispán, Granada:España, 1994  

Military units and formations of Italy in the Spanish Civil War
Armoured units and formations of Italy